U0126 is a highly selective inhibitor of both MEK1 and MEK2, a type of MAPK/ERK kinase. U0126 was found to functionally antagonize AP-1 transcriptional activity via noncompetitive inhibition of the dual specificity kinase MEK with IC50 of 72 nM for MEK1 and 58 nM for MEK2. U0126 inhibited anchorage-independent growth of Ki-ras-transformed rat fibroblasts by simultaneously blocking both extracellular signal-regulated kinase (ERK) and mammalian target of rapamycin (mTOR)-p70(S6K) pathways. The effects of U0126 on the growth of eight human breast cancer cell lines shown that U0126 selectively repressed anchorage-independent growth of MDA-MB231 and HBC4 cells, two lines with constitutively activated ERK. Loss of contact with substratum triggers apoptosis in many normal cell types, a phenomenon termed anoikis. U0126 sensitized MDA-MB231 and HBC4 to anoikis, i.e., upon treatment with U0126, cells deprived of anchorage entered apoptosis.

U0126 is also a weak inhibitor of PKC, Raf, ERK, JNK, MEKK, MKK-3, MKK-4/SEK, MKK-6, Cdk2 and Cdk4.

Its potential for wiping long-term memories in rats has been studied at the Center for Neural Science at New York University.

See also 
Xantocillin

References 

Protein kinase inhibitors
Nitriles
Anilines